Oh No It Isn't! is a novel published in 1997 by Paul Cornell from the Virgin New Adventures featuring the fictional archaeologist Bernice Summerfield.

The New Adventures were a series of novels based on the long-running British science fiction television series Doctor Who, made by the BBC. They had originally been licensed Doctor Who stories, but in the wake of the return of Doctor Who to television screens with the 1996 movie, the BBC did not renew publisher Virgin Books' licence.

Virgin had for some time planned for a spin-off series based on the characters and settings created in the Doctor Who New Adventures. With the licence gone, they continued the monthly release schedule of the New Adventures, but switched to stories featuring the character of Bernice Summerfield (known as Benny), beginning with Oh No It Isn't!. The author, Paul Cornell, had originally created Benny as a companion for the Doctor. She appeared regularly in the Doctor Who New Adventures for a period, before ceasing travelling with the Doctor in another Cornell-penned work, Happy Endings. She was re-introduced as a regular character in the last Doctor Who New Adventure, The Dying Days, which led into Oh No It Isn't!.

Oh No It Isn't! also provided the initial set-up and background to the Benny-led New Adventures that followed, including re-introducing the Doctor's pet cat Wolsey (originally from Cornell's New Adventure Human Nature) and the artificial intelligence known as God (originally from the New Adventure The Also People). The book also introduces the alien race the Grels, who would re-appear in later Benny stories.

The novel title and content reference the traditions of pantomime, reflecting Cornell's interest in traditional conceptions and icons of Englishness.

Plot
Bernice Summerfield's investigation into the lost civilisation of Perfection takes a turn for the strange when her cat Wolsey turns into Puss in Boots…

Audio adaptation

In 1998, Oh No It Isn't! was adapted by Big Finish Productions into an audio drama starring Lisa Bowerman as Bernice. This was the debut release by Big Finish, who started with a series of Bernice Summerfield-led adaptations of New Adventure novels before later obtaining a licence to do original Doctor Who stories.

Cornell was asked to do the adaptation but was too busy, instead suggesting his then girlfriend Jacqueline Rayner could do it. Rayner went on to write all but one of Big Finish's New Adventure adaptations.

The audio drama also features actor Nicholas Courtney who is better known for playing the recurring character of Brigadier Lethbridge-Stewart in the television series Doctor Who.

Cast
Bernice Summerfield — Lisa Bowerman
Wolsey the Cat — Nicholas Courtney
Jayne Waspo/Bitchy — Jo Castleton
Michael Doran/Cute — Jonathan Brüün
Captain Balsam/King Rupert — Colin McIntyre
Lt Prince/Prince Charming — Nicholas Briggs
Professor Candy/Dame Candy — James Campbell
The Grand Vizier — Mark Gatiss
The Grel Master — Alistair Lock

Trivia
The character of Michael Doran is named after a well-known Doctor Who fan.
Mark Gatiss, who performs in the audio adaptation, had also written New Adventures novels himself and went on to write for the 2005 television series of Doctor Who.

External links
The Cloister Library - Oh No It Isn't! 
The Whoniverse - Discontinuity Guide entry for Oh No It Isn't! 
Doctor Who Reference Guide entry for Oh No It Isn't! 
Doctor Who Reference Guide entry for Oh No It Isn't! audio adaptation 

1997 British novels
1997 science fiction novels
Virgin New Adventures
Bernice Summerfield audio plays
Novels by Paul Cornell
Bernice Summerfield novels